Royal Air Force Fiskerton or more simply RAF Fiskerton was a Royal Air Force station located north of the Lincolnshire village of Fiskerton,  east of Lincoln, Lincolnshire, England. The airfield closed at the end of the war in 1945 being a satellite to RAF Scampton and very little now exists. The station was home to some 2000 personnel during the war, and various technical sites were in what is now the village of Fiskerton. A small cluster of semi-derelict buildings still exist and are still in use at the end of the present village on the road out to short ferry. Drake's view is the entrance to these old buildings.

History

It was one of many new bomber airfields built in the early part of the Second World War. The airfield was situated north of the village. It was one of only 15 RAF airfields equipped with FIDO, a fog-clearing system utilising petrol pumped through pipes alongside the main runway and burned via a sequence of nozzles.

No. 49 Squadron RAF and No. 576 Squadron RAF were stationed at RAF Fiskerton. 49 Squadron took part in the Peenemünde raid on the research and development centre for the V2 missile. 576 Squadron took part in the raid on Hitler's hideout at Berchtesgaden and in Operation Manna.

Between 1962 and 1992 a Headquarters of the Royal Observer Corps was located within the airfield boundary.

The following units were here at some point:
 No. 61 Maintenance Unit RAF
 No. 93 Maintenance Unit RAF
 No. 141 Squadron RAF
 No. 150 Squadron RAF
 No. 255 Maintenance Unit RAF
 No. 1514 (Beam Approach Training) Flight RAF
 No. 1690 Bomber (Defence) Training Flight RAF
 No. 2753 Squadron RAF Regiment
 No. 2799 Squadron RAF Regiment

Current use

Very little now remains of the old airfield. Land which once formed part of the aerodrome was donated by the owner, the late Geoff Stuffin, so a memorial to 49 and 576 Squadrons could be erected. Today the memorial can be found on the side of the road near the old main runway together with a plaque recording the generosity of Mr Stuffin.

Gallery

See also
 List of former Royal Air Force stations

References

External links

FiskertonAirfield.org.uk
Airfields & Aviation Memorials

Royal Air Force stations in Lincolnshire